Charles Ritchie Russell, Baron Russell of Killowen, PC (12 January 1908 – 23 June 1986) was a British lawyer and judge who served as a lord of appeal in ordinary between 1975 and 1982.

Biography 
Russell was born in London, the son of Frank Russell, Baron Russell of Killowen and the grandson of Charles Russell, Baron Russell of Killowen, both Lords of Appeal in Ordinary. His maternal grandfather was the Scottish politician Charles Ritchie, 1st Baron Ritchie of Dundee. Following his father, he was educated at Beaumont College and Oriel College, Oxford, where he took a Third in Jurisprudence. He was called to the bar by Lincoln's Inn in 1931.

During the Second World War, Russell was commissioned into the Royal Artillery, and flew into France on D-Day by glider. Wounded in action, he was mentioned in dispatches and received the French Croix de Guerre. Returning to the bar after the war, he took silk in 1948 at the age of forty, like his father and grandfather. He was Attorney General of the Duchy of Cornwall from 1951 to 1960. A leading Chancery counsel, he was appointed to the Chancery Division of the High Court in 1960, receiving the customary knighthood. He was promoted Lord Justice of Appeal in 1962, and was sworn of the Privy Council.

In 1960 he pleaded guilty to a charge of drunk driving, which was thought to have delayed his promotion. Nevertheless, on 30 September 1975, he was appointed Lord of Appeal in Ordinary and was made a life peer with the title Baron Russell of Killowen, of Killowen in the County Down, the same title that his grandfather and father had held.

Famous judgments
Whitehouse -v- Lemon; Whitehouse -v- Gay News Ltd On Appeal From Regina -v- Lemon[1979] 2 WLR 281

Arms

References

External links

1908 births
1986 deaths
Knights Bachelor
Russell of Killowen 
Members of the Judicial Committee of the Privy Council
Attorneys-General of the Duchy of Cornwall
20th-century British lawyers
Members of the Privy Council of the United Kingdom
Chancery Division judges
Lords Justices of Appeal
People educated at Beaumont College
Alumni of Oriel College, Oxford
Royal Artillery officers
Sons of life peers
Members of Lincoln's Inn
Recipients of the Croix de Guerre 1939–1945 (France)
Russell 2
Life peers created by Elizabeth II